Alexander Awdijan (born June 27, 1977) is an Armenian professional boxer. He was the GBU 2007 World Champion and the International German Champion of 2006.

References

External links

Armenian male boxers
1977 births
Living people
German people of Armenian descent
German male boxers
Super-middleweight boxers